The European Law Reporter is a bimonthly peer-reviewed academic journal covering  European Union and European Economic Area law. It was established in 1998 and published articles till 2016, case-notes, and book reviews in both English and German which typically focus on recent jurisprudence of the Court of Justice of the European Union, the EFTA Court, and the European Court of Human Rights. The journal also covers supreme court judgments with a European dimension.

External links

https://www.abe.pl/en/journal/28902/european-law-reporter
Publisher as of 2016: St. Gallen Inst. für Europarecht, Univ. St. Gallen HSG Luxemburg

European law journals
Publications established in 1998
Bimonthly journals
Multilingual journals